Canada has significant per-capita membership in credit unions, representing more than a third of the working-age population. Credit union membership is largest in Quebec, where they are known as caisses populaires (people's banks), and in western Canada.

Legislation

Responsibility for the incorporation and regulation of credit unions resides primarily at the provincial and territorial level in Canada.  Credit union legislation exists in every province of Canada but does not currently exist in the three northern territories. Credit unions and caisses populaires operate in every province of Canada.  In Quebec, caisses populaires are required to be formally federated with the Caisses Populaires Desjardins.

Federally regulated credit unions

Legislation was adopted under the federal Bank Act in 2012 to allow for the creation of federal credit unions. On July 1, 2016, the Caisse populaire acadienne ltée (later rebranded as UNI Financial Cooperation), with its 155,000 members, became the first federal credit union in Canada. Coast Capital Savings announced the approval from OSFI to become the second federally regulated credit union in Canada beginning on November 1, 2018, the first federal credit union based in British Columbia.

Provincially regulated credit unions

As of September 30, 2014, there were 696 credit unions or caisses populaires operating in Canada.

Outside Quebec

As of December 31, 2017, there were 286 independently operated credit unions and caisses populaires operating in the nine provinces outside of Quebec holding combined consolidated assets of $223.7 billion CAD.

The largest of these include Vancity, Coast Capital Savings, Meridian Credit Union, Servus Credit Union, First West Credit Union, Alterna Savings and Credit Union Limited, Conexus Credit Union, Affinity Credit Union, Steinbach Credit Union, and Assiniboine Credit Union.

272 of these credit unions and caisses populaires were affiliated through a provincial or regional credit union central to Canadian Credit Union Association, the national trade association. These credit unions operated 1,746 branches across the country with 5.3 million members and $216.3 billion in assets.

Within Quebec

Within Quebec there are 344 caisses that are formally federated with the Caisses Populaires Desjardins as of September 30, 2014.

In 2012, Desjardins served nearly 5.6 million members from 897 locations, with $196.7 billion in assets.

Insurance
Most credit unions in Canada are incorporated provincially and are insured by provincially established institutions.

 Alberta – Credit Union Deposit Guarantee Corporation (Alberta)
 British Columbia – Credit Union Deposit Insurance Corporation (British Columbia)
 Manitoba – Deposit Guarantee Corporation of Manitoba
 New Brunswick Credit Union Deposit Insurance Corporation
 Newfoundland and Labrador – Credit Union Deposit Guarantee Corporation (Newfoundland and Labrador)
 Nova Scotia Credit Union Deposit Insurance Corporation
 Ontario – Financial Services Regulatory Authority of Ontario
 Prince Edward Island – Credit Union Deposit Insurance Corporation (Prince Edward Island)
 Saskatchewan – Credit Union Deposit Guarantee Corporation (Saskatchewan)

Federally-incorporated credit unions are insured by the Canada Deposit Insurance Corporation.

Credit union firsts in Canada
Credit unions have a history of innovation in Canadian financial services. Here are some of the products and services that credit unions were first to market:

First financial institutions to lend to women in their own names (in the 1960s)
First to offer daily interest savings
First full-service ABMs
First fully functional online banking
First loans based on borrower character
First payroll deduction service for deposits and loan payments
First open mortgages
First home equity lines of credit
First debit card service.
First registered education plans.
First cheque imaging service
First mobile branch with ATM for servicing small communities

See also
 Banking in Canada
 Credit unions in the United Kingdom
 Credit unions in the United States
 ATM usage fees#The Exchange

References

Credit unions of Canada